Shing Mun Valley Sports Ground (Chinese: 城門谷運動場) is a sports ground located in Tsuen Wan, New Territories, Hong Kong. It consists of a Tartan track and a football pitch. It replaces Tsuen Wan Sports Ground as the only sports ground in Tsuen Wan after Tsuen Wan Sports Ground was demolished.

The football pitch hosts Hong Kong First Division League club Eastern Salon's home match starting in the 2013–14 Hong Kong First Division League.

See also
 Shing Mun Valley

References

External links

 Leisure and Cultural Services Department - Shing Mun Valley Sports Ground

 
Sports venues in Hong Kong
Football venues in Hong Kong
Athletics (track and field) venues in Hong Kong
Tsuen Wan District